The Canal de Montech is an 11 km waterway in southwestern France connecting the Canal de Garonne in Montech and the Tarn River in Montauban. It is also known as the Montauban Branch.

A lock at Moissac also connects the Canal de Garonne to a lower section of the Tarn. A proposal exists to create a waterway ring, including the Canal de Montech, by restoring navigation to the stretch of the Tarn between Moissac and Montauban.

Port Canal in Montauban

See also
 List of canals in France

References

Montech
Canals opened in 1843
1843 establishments in France